The 1985–86 Texas Longhorns women's basketball team represents the University of Texas at Austin in the 1985–86 college basketball season. It was head coach Jody Conradt's tenth season at Texas. The Longhorns were members of the Southwest Conference and played their home games at the Frank Erwin Center. They finished the season a perfect 34–0, 16–0 in SWC play to win the regular season and SWC tournament. They received an automatic bid to the NCAA women's basketball tournament where they defeated USC to win their first National Championship.

National championship

After earning a number one national ranking in 1984, but stumbling in the regional's finals to national power Louisiana Tech, Texas seemed poised for a better result in 1985. Not only did the team earn another top national ranking, but they entered the NCAA tournament knowing that if they reached the Final Four, they would have the home court advantage with the final games scheduled for their own Frank Erwin Center. Home court would play a part, but not the part hoped for by the Longhorns. In the regional semi-finals, played at the home court of Western Kentucky University, the Hilltoppers stymied the Longhorn's hopes with a 92–90 victory. They would return to the 1986 tournament viewed as one of the top teams in the nation and were once again ranked the top team in the nation, but they still did not have a Final Four NCAA appearance on their resume.

The Texas team won their first game easily, then continued to the regional, this time on their home court. They dispatched Oklahoma easily, then struggled against Mississippi, who were trying to prevent the team from a Final Four yet again. This time, Texas prevailed and beat Mississippi by three points to head to their first NCAA Final Four. Their opponent in the semifinal was none other than Western Kentucky, who had denied them the previous year. This time, the result would be very different, as the Longhorns beat Western Kentucky easily, 90–65.

The other semifinal pitted Tennessee against Southern California.  Cheryl Miller was the best player at USC, and had led the team to the national championship in 1984. Miller went on to play for the USA national team and helped the USA win the gold medal at the 1984 Olympics. 1986 was Miller's senior year at USC. The game between Tennessee and USC was a rematch of a physical game played in December, in which Miller was thrown out of the game for an elbow. The game was close, but USC ended up with an 85–77 win. In the rematch, Miller would again come out of the game, but under very different circumstances. She was worried about getting hurt, and with a 70–51 lead, didn't need to stay in. In that game, USC won by 24 points, 83–59.

That set up the championship game between USC and undefeated Texas. The Texas team was very deep but had suffered a number of injuries during the year. The game was close early with the Trojans leading at times in the first half, but Texas went on a 10–2 run to take a seven-point lead. Miller would have one of the worst games in her career. Although she scored 16 points, twelve of those were from the free throw line. She was only 2 for 11 from the field, without a single point in the second half. In contrast, Texas' Clarissa Davis came off the bench to score 25 and earn Most Outstanding Player honors. USC's Cynthia Cooper scored 27 points, and Texas won the national championship 97–81 to complete the first undefeated season in NCAA history.

Roster

Schedule

|-
!colspan=12 style=""| Regular season

|-
!colspan=12 style=""| SWC women's tournament

|-
!colspan=12 style=""| NCAA women's tournament

Rankings

See also
Texas Longhorns women's basketball

References

Texas Longhorns women's basketball seasons
Texas
NCAA Division I women's basketball tournament championship seasons
NCAA Division I women's basketball tournament Final Four seasons